Mirza Qavam al-Din Mohammad was an Iranian cleric and statesman, who served as the sadr-i mamalik (minister of religion) from 1661 to 1664. He was the son of Mirza Rafi al-Din Muhammad, and thus the brother of the high-ranking statesman Khalifeh Sultan.

Sources 
 
 

Politicians from Isfahan
17th-century Iranian politicians
17th-century deaths
17th-century births
Khalifeh family
Shahristani family
17th-century people of Safavid Iran